Alexeter is a genus of insect belonging to the family Ichneumonidae.

The genus was first described by Förster in 1869.

The species of this genus are found in Eurasia and Northern America.

Species:
 Alexeter fallax

References

Ichneumonidae
Ichneumonidae genera